Griffin Riley Sabatini (born 23 September 1998) is a Swiss semi-professional footballer who plays as a midfielder for East Stirlingshire in Scottish Lowland League.

Career
Sabatini was born in Zimbabwe but grew up in Switzerland where he attended the International School of Geneva. In 2017, he attended Northeastern University, playing for their college soccer team.

In August 2019, he signed his first professional contract with Ukrainian Premier League side Dnipro-1, penning a one-year deal. On 19 July 2020, Sabatini made his professional debut as a substitute in a 3–0 win over Vorskla Poltava.

On 3 August 2020, Sabatini joined Scottish League One side Airdrieonians on a season-long loan deal.

In August 2022, Sabatini joined Lowland Football League side Berwick Rangers after a spell with Gretna 2008.

In January 2023, Sabatini joined Lowland Football League side East Stirlingshire on a deal until the end of the season.

References

External links

Living people
1998 births
People from Harare
Association football midfielders
Swiss men's footballers
Northeastern Huskies men's soccer players
SC Dnipro-1 players
Airdrieonians F.C. players
Gretna F.C. 2008 players
Ukrainian Premier League players
Scottish Professional Football League players
Swiss expatriate footballers
Expatriate footballers in Ukraine
Swiss expatriate sportspeople in Ukraine
Expatriate footballers in Scotland
Swiss expatriate sportspeople in Scotland
Berwick Rangers F.C. players
Lowland Football League players
East Stirlingshire F.C. players